Zoran Živković may refer to:
Zoran Živković (handballer) (born 1945), Serbian handball player and coach widely known under his nickname Tuta
Zoran Živković (writer) (born 1948), Serbian writer
Zoran Živković (politician) (born 1960), politician and former Prime Minister of Serbia
Zoran Živković (footballer) (born 1967), Croatian international footballer